LPM may refer to:

Science and technology
 Landau–Pomeranchuk–Migdal effect, in particle physics
 Lateral plate mesoderm, found at the periphery of the embryo
 Lipoprotein particle metabolism
 Linear probability model, a regression model used in statistics
 Litre per minute, a volumetric flow rate
 Linear period modulation, a technique for chirp compression
 Luyten Proper-Motion Catalogue
 Line pairs per millimetre, a unit of spatial frequency in image-processing applications

Computing
 Longest prefix match, a technique used by Internet routers
 Live Partition Mobility, a technology for moving live virtual machines between IBM POWER servers

Other uses
Louisville Public Media, a public radio non-profit in Louisville, Kentucky
Lakhs Per Month, used in India to denote an income of one lakh (100000) Indian Rupees per month
 Malaysia Premier League (Liga Premier Malaysia), a second-tier football league in Malaysia
 Law practice management, the management of a law practice
 Lego Power Miners, a Lego series
 Libertarian Party of Michigan, a political party
 Local People Meter, a Nielsen ratings device
 Landless Peoples Movement, in South Africa
 Log pod Mangartom, a village in Slovenia